Natalia Medvedeva was the defending champion, but lost in the semifinals to Katrina Adams.

Sabine Appelmans won the title by defeating Adams 6–2, 6–4 in the final.

Seeds

Draw

Finals

Top half

Bottom half

References

External links
 Official results archive (ITF)
 Official results archive (WTA)

Virginia Slims of Nashville
Virginia Slims of Nashville
1991 in sports in Tennessee
Women's sports in Tennessee